Naomi Shohan is an American production designer. Her work can be seen in such films as American Beauty, I Am Legend, Constantine, and A Wrinkle in Time. She studied for a time at the California Institute of the Arts before dropping out, and later studied philosophy at the University at Stony Brook. She became a production designer by working on films made by a former boyfriend.

References

External links
 

Year of birth missing (living people)
Living people
American production designers
California Institute of the Arts alumni
Stony Brook University alumni
Women production designers